Gabriele Antonini (born 16 April 1938, died October 2018) was an Italian film, stage and television actor.

Life and career
Born in Rome, the son of an army general, Antonini was chosen by Mario Monicelli for the role of Sandro in Fathers and Sons when he was still attended high school. Following the success of the film Antonini interrupted his studies and started appearing in a significant number of films, being mainly active in teen comedies and peplum films. He was also active on stage, in which he worked with Luchino Visconti, Giorgio Albertazzi and Diego Fabbri, among others. He was also active as a voice actor and a dubber.

Filmography

References

External links 
 

1938 births
2018 deaths
Italian male film actors
Male actors from Rome
Italian male television actors
Italian male stage actors